Olanzapine/samidorphan (OLZ/SAM), sold under the brand name Lybalvi, is a fixed-dose combination medication for the treatment of schizophrenia and bipolar I disorder. It contains olanzapine, an atypical antipsychotic, and samidorphan, an opioid antagonist. Samidorphan reduces the weight gain associated with olanzapine while still allowing olanzapine to exert its therapeutic effect. The formulation was approved for medical use in the United States in May 2021.

References

External links 
 
 

Alpha-1 blockers
Antihistamines
Atypical antipsychotics
Combination drugs
Dopamine antagonists
Experimental drugs
Mu-opioid receptor antagonists
Muscarinic antagonists
Serotonin receptor antagonists